The Ligue de Crosse Junior du Québec (LCJQ) is a Junior C box lacrosse league sanctioned by the Fédération de crosse du Québec in Canada. Formed in 2015, the LCJQ has four member clubs.

Teams

Former teams 
Montreal Shamrocks (2015) - played a partial schedule while also competing in FNJBLL

Champions

References

External links
 LCJQ website

Lacrosse leagues in Canada